Brian O'Neal Biggs is a Republican member of the North Carolina House of Representatives who has represented the 70th district (including parts of Randolph County) since 2023. A former member of the Randolph County Board of education, he ousted incumbent Pat Hurley in the 2022 primary election.

Committee assignments

2023-2024 session
Appropriations
Appropriations - Information Technology
Education K-12
Election Law and Campaign Finance Reform 
Regulatory Reform
Transportation

Electoral history

2022

2018

2014

2010

References

Living people
Year of birth missing (living people)
People from Trinity, North Carolina
Republican Party members of the North Carolina House of Representatives
21st-century American politicians